The South African Railways Class 14 4-8-2 of 1913 was a steam locomotive.

Between 1913 and 1915, the South African Railways placed 45 Class 14 steam locomotives with a 4-8-2 Mountain type wheel arrangement in service in Natal.

Manufacturer
The Class 14 locomotive was a development of the Class 12 and was similar enough to it that many components were interchangeable. It was ordered from Robert Stephenson and Company in 1913 and was delivered in three batches between 1913 and 1915, numbered in the range from 1701 to 1745.

Characteristics

At the time the Class 14 was designed by D.A. Hendrie, Chief Mechanical Engineer (CME) of the South African Railways (SAR), it was believed that small differences in wheel diameter had disproportionate effects on performance. The SAR already had the Class 3B Mountain type with  diameter coupled wheels and the Class 12 Mountain type with  diameter coupled wheels, but for the  radius curves and 1 in 30 (3⅓%) compensated gradients of the Natal mainline, the Class 14 with  diameter coupled wheels was designed as an intermediate-sized locomotive.

Steam locomotives were shipped in a dismantled state and erected at one of the SAR Shops.  They were then steam-tested and painted before being released into traffic. Upon delivery, the Class 14 locomotives could not be erected departmentally owing to the congestion of work in the Durban workshops. The assembly work was therefore contracted to Messrs. James Brown and Company of Congella.

The Class 14 had Walschaerts valve gear and a Belpaire firebox and was superheated. Apart from the differences in their coupled wheel diameters, the Class 14 was a better locomotive with a more modern cylinder design, having straighter ports and a larger steam chest volume than the other two classes.

A feature in the design of the leading bogie was that the bogie frame was a single steel casting to which the cast steel horns were bolted to take the axle boxes. An innovation was the arrangement of the laminated side control springs in combination with two point swing links, which would be part of all Hendrie's subsequent designs. To prevent trouble which had been experienced earlier owing to the fracture of the smokebox saddle and frame stretcher castings which contained steam chest passages, and also leakage at exhaust joints, the blast pipe breeches were made separate castings and not integral with the centre stretcher casting.

The engines were fitted with Pyle National turbo-generators and headlamps, with the generator attached to the top of the smokebox, ahead of the chimney. It had the Hasler speed indicator, sight feed lubricators, Hendrie's steam reversing gear, steam operation for rocking the firegrate, Gresham and Craven injectors, steam brakes and combination vacuum ejectors.

Watson Standard boilers
During the 1930s, many serving locomotives were reboilered with a standard boiler type designed by then CME A.G. Watson as part of his standardisation policy. Such Watson Standard reboilered locomotives were reclassified by adding an "R" suffix to their classification.

From 1935, all the Class 14 locomotives were reboilered with Watson Standard no. 2 boilers and reclassified to Class 14R. In the process, the engines were also equipped with Watson cabs with their distinctive slanted fronts, compared to the conventional vertical fronts of the original cabs. Only slight modifications were found necessary to take the new boilers, such as a cast packer under the smokebox saddle and a widening of the running board below the cab. The flangeless leading coupled wheels were flanged and Type MR tenders were attached to the reboilered engines.

Their original Belpaire boilers were fitted with Ramsbottom safety valves, while the Watson Standard boiler was fitted with Pop safety valves. An obvious difference between an original and a Watson Standard reboilered locomotive is usually a rectangular regulator cover, just to the rear of the chimney on the reboilered locomotive. In the case of the Class 14 locomotives, two even more obvious differences are the Watson cab and the absence of the Belpaire firebox hump between the cab and boiler on the reboilered locomotives.

Service

South African Railways
The locomotives were placed in service on the mainline between Durban and Ladysmith in Natal. With the gradual further electrification of the Natal mainline in the later 1920s, they were eventually left to operate on the old mainline route via Botha's Hill until that line was also electrified. Most of them were then allocated to Empangeni in the north and Port Shepstone in the south.

These were the most numerous, useful and ubiquitous class of steam locomotive to see service in Natal. They all gave more than 60 years of service, of which more than half was on the Natal mainline, originally as Class 14 on the mainline and later as Class 14R on all sorts of mixed traffic work on secondary lines. In 1976, many were transferred to the Witwatersrand for shunting service. By 1983, they were all withdrawn from service.

International
As a result of the collapse of railways during the civil war in Mozambique in the late 1970s, Class 14R locomotives became the mainstay of locomotive power in Swaziland until they were eventually replaced there by Class 15AR locomotives.

Similarly, while Zimbabwe was rebuilding its Garratt fleet, Class 14R locomotives were hired for shunting service to release Garratt locomotives for mainline work.

+ 1703 Hired to Rhodesia/Zimbabwe 04/1981 to 03/1982

+ 1706 Hired to Rhodesia/Zimbabwe 04/1981 to 03/1982

+ 1707 Hired to Rhodesia/Zimbabwe 06/1981 to 10/1982

+ 1709 Hired to Rhodesia/Zimbabwe 07/1981 to 10/1982

+ 1712 Hired to Rhodesia/Zimbabwe 04/1981 to 11/1982

+ 1715 Hired to Rhodesia/Zimbabwe 10/1981 to 08/1982

+ 1725 Hired to Rhodesia/Zimbabwe 09/1981 to 08/1982

+ 1728 Hired to Rhodesia/Zimbabwe 10/1981 to 11/1982

+ 1731 Hired to Rhodesia/Zimbabwe 02/1981 to 10/1982

+ 1733 Hired to Rhodesia/Zimbabwe 07/1981 to 04/1982

+ 1745 Hired to Rhodesia/Zimbabwe 09/1981 to 10/1982

Industry
Thirteen Class 14R locomotives were eventually sold into industrial service:
 No. 1701 became Apex Colliery no. 5 at Greenside.
 Numbers 1705 and 1737 respectively became Grootvlei Proprietary Mines no. 5 Joyce and no. 4. No. 4 was later renumbered to no. 6 Graham.
 Numbers 1711, 1714, 1719, 1732 and 1735 went to Rustenburg Platinum Mines, retaining their SAR numbers.
 Numbers 1723 and 1745 went to Natal Cambrian Colliery at Ballangeiech as no. 1 and 2 respectively.
 No. 1729 went to the Vaal Reefs Gold Mine.
 No. 1730 became Randfontein Estates Gold Mine no. 5.
 No. 1740 went to Newcastle Platberg Colliery and later to Ballangeiech Colliery.

Preservation

Illustration
The main picture and the builder's picture show the Class 14 with its original Belpaire firebox, while the remainder are all of locomotives with Watson Standard boilers and round-topped fireboxes.

References

External links

1740
1740
1740
4-8-2 locomotives
2D1 locomotives
Robert Stephenson and Company locomotives
Cape gauge railway locomotives
Railway locomotives introduced in 1913
1913 in South Africa